was a train station in the town of Inawashiro, Yama District, Fukushima Prefecture, Japan. It has not been in use since 2007.

Lines

Layout
Inawashirokohan Station had one side platform serving a single bi-directional track. The station was unattended.

External links
 JR East station information 

Railway stations in Fukushima Prefecture
Ban'etsu West Line
Railway stations closed in 2007
Inawashiro, Fukushima